Axos Financial is a bank holding company based in Las Vegas, Nevada and is the parent of Axos Bank, a direct bank.

Origin and name change 
Axos originated as a company known as BofI Holding, Inc., which was founded by Jerry Englert and Gary Lewis Evans with $14 million of startup capital.  BofI was incorporated in Delaware in 1999 and began operations as Bank of Internet on July 4, 2000. The start date of July 4 was purposely chosen because it showed that the bank would be open on a day that other banks were closed due to Independence Day.

BofI became a public company via an initial public offering on March 15, 2005. It offered 3,052,745 shares of common stock at a price of $11.50 per share.

On October 1, 2018, BofI Holding re-branded as Axos Financial, and switched its stock exchange from NASDAQ to the NYSE.

Lending practices 
The bank has made larger loans to wealthy individuals that other banks have turned down, albeit at higher interest rates. 

In March 2022, Newsweek and Forbes reported that Axos made a $100 million mortgage loan to Donald Trump's company. The loan followed an announcement by Trump's former accounting firm stating that the Trump organization's financial statements should "no longer be relied on."

Approximately 71.5% of the company's loans are secured by properties in California, 11.8% are secured by properties in New York, and 5.1% are secured by properties in Florida.

Acquisitions 
In September 2013, the company acquired $173 million in deposits from Principal Bank.

In September 2015, the company acquired H&R Block Bank and became the issuing bank for H&R Block-branded credit cards and lines of credit. It launched a co-branded Individual Retirement Accounts (IRAs) program with H&R Block in January 2016.

In March 2016, the company acquired $140 million of equipment leases from Pacific Western Equipment Finance.

In November 2018, the bank acquired $3 billion in assets and liabilities of Nationwide Bank, a subsidiary of Nationwide Mutual Insurance Company.

In January 2019, Axos Financial acquired COR Clearing LLC. The unit has since been renamed Axos Clearing.

In March 2019, Axos Financial acquired the robo-advisory platform WiseBanyan. The unit has since been renamed Axos Invest and as of early 2020 is keeping the "free" business model originally designed by the start-up's founders. According to the investor presentation, Axos plans to use WiseBanyan to mine more personal data about its client base.

In March 2019, Axos Financial acquired approximately $173 million in deposits from MWABank.

In April 2021, Axos Financial acquired EAS (E*TRADE Advisor Services). However, it was closed in July 2021 as a part of rebranding.

Management 
Gregory Garrabrants was appointed chief executive officer of Axos' predecessor company BofI Holding in October 2007. Prior to that, he was senior vice president at IndyMac Bancorp. Formerly known as Countrywide Mortgage Investment, IndyMac Bancorp failed in 2008.

In April 2019, it was reported that Garrabrants earned $34.5 million, making him the highest paid bank CEO of 2018.

According to Bloomberg News, in March 2020 Garrabrants sent an email advising employees that he expected them to be as productive working at home during the coronavirus/COVID-19 pandemic as they had been while working in the office.

Financial results
On July 29, 2021, the company announced its net income for the last quarter of 2021 as $54.3 million.

References

External links
 Axos Bank Home Page

Companies based in Las Vegas
American companies established in 1999
Banks established in 1999
Banks based in Nevada
1999 establishments in Nevada
Companies formerly listed on the Nasdaq
Companies listed on the New York Stock Exchange
2005 initial public offerings
https://investors.axosfinancial.com/corporate-profile/